The 2022 Ohio House of Representatives elections were held on November 8, 2022, to elect representatives in all 99 districts of the Ohio House of Representatives. Members were elected in single-member constituencies to two-year terms. These elections were held concurrently with various federal and state elections, including for Governor of Ohio and the Ohio Senate.

Although primary elections were originally scheduled for May 3, they were postponed to August 2 after the Supreme Court of Ohio rejected state legislative maps approved by the state redistricting commission as part of the 2020 redistricting cycle.

Predictions

Overview

Summary by district

Closest races 
Seats where the margin of victory was under 10%:
 
  gain 
  gain
 
  gain
  
  gain
 
  
  
  
  gain 
  
  gain

Outgoing incumbents

Republicans 
 District 4: Robert R. Cupp is term-limited.
 District 5: Tim Ginter is term-limited.
 District 27: Tom Brinkman is term-limited.
 District 54: Paul Zeltwanger is term-limited.
 District 79: Kyle Koehler is term-limited.
 District 85: Nino Vitale is term-limited.

Democrats 
 District 8: Kent Smith is term-limited.
 District 22: David J. Leland is term-limited.
 District 34: Emilia Sykes is term-limited.
 District 46: Michael Sheehy is term-limited.
 District 58: Michele Lepore-Hagan is term-limited.
 District 64: Michael O'Brien is term-limited.

See also 
 2022 Ohio elections

Notes

References 

Ohio House
House
Ohio House of Representatives elections